The coat of arms of the city of Rybnik in Poland consists of a blue shield bearing a white pike rising diagonally between two floral patterns.  The arms are an example of canting arms, since ryb means "fish".  This coat was adopted by the Rybnik City Council on November 20, 2000.

A formal blazon in English is: Azure, a pike bendwise between two floral patterns of a water-nut, all argent.

External links
 Coat of Arms on the Municipal Page

Rybnik
Rybnik
Rybnik